George Villiers may refer to:

 George Villiers (of Brokesby) (–1606), minor English gentleman, father of George Villiers, 1st Duke of Buckingham
 George Villiers, 1st Duke of Buckingham (1592–1628), courtier of James I of England, minister to Charles I
 George Villiers, 2nd Duke of Buckingham (1628–1687), English politician, son of the first Duke, exiled with Charles II
 George Villiers, 4th Earl of Jersey (1735–1805), English Member of Parliament for Tamworth, Aldborough, Dover
 George Villiers (1759–1827), English Member of Parliament for Warwick
 George Villiers, 4th Earl of Clarendon (1800–1870), English diplomat and statesman, Foreign Secretary
 George Villiers, 6th Earl of Clarendon (1877–1955), British Conservative politician, Governor-General of South Africa
 Georges Villiers (1899–1982), French mining engineer

See also
 George Child Villiers (disambiguation)